Ahom Raja's palace is an historic building in Garhgaon, Assam State, India.

The four-story palace has a dome shaped roof and also contains a chamber. Two of the four original watchtowers survive. The palace contains three halls on the ground floor that face west.

History 
Garhgaon was the home of the Alom dynasty.  The palace was built by king Rajeswar Singha in 1752 CE.

References 

Buildings and structures in Assam